Cornelly Serem is a Kenyan politician who is a former member of the National Assembly for Aldai Constituency. He was a member of the Jubilee Party.

Election results

References

Kenyan politicians
Year of birth missing (living people)
Living people
Members of the 12th Parliament of Kenya